Flames of Doom is a role-playing game adventure published by TSR in 1987 for the Marvel Super Heroes role-playing game.

Contents
Flames of Doom is a scenario for the Advanced rules, the fourth in the future-history X-Men series: the final battle against the Sentinels.

Publication history
MX4 Flames of Doom was written by David "Zeb" Cook, with a cover by John Statema and Jerry Ordway, and was published by TSR, Inc., in 1987 as a 32-page book, a large color map, and an outer folder.

Reception

Reviews

References

Marvel Comics role-playing game adventures
Role-playing game supplements introduced in 1987